The women's tournament in ice hockey at the 2006 Winter Olympics was held in Turin, Italy from 11 to 20 February 2006. Eight countries qualified for the tournament.

Qualification

Canada, United States, Finland and Sweden qualified as the top four teams in the IIHF World Ranking in 2004. Italy qualified as host team. The remaining three teams qualified from qualification tournaments.

Notes

Rosters

Preliminary round
All times are local (UTC+1).

Group A

Group B

Placement round

Bracket

5–8th place semifinals

Seventh place game

Fifth place game

Playoff round

Bracket

Semifinals

Bronze medal game

Gold medal game

Final ranking

Statistics

Leading scorers

GP = Games played; G = Goals; A = Assists; Pts = Points; PIM = Penalties in minutes; +/− = Plus-minus; POS = Position
Source: IIHF.com

Goaltending leaders
Only the top five goaltenders, based on save percentage, who have played at least 40% of their team's minutes, are included in this list.

TOI = Time on Ice (minutes:seconds); GA = Goals against; GAA = Goals against average; SA = Shots against; Sv% = Save percentage; SO = ShutoutsSource:IIHF.com

Awards
Most Valuable Player:  Hayley Wickenheiser
Best players selected by the directorate:
Best Goaltender:  Kim Martin
Best Defenceman:  Angela Ruggiero
Best Forward:  Hayley Wickenheiser
Source: IIHF.com
Media All-Stars
Goaltender:  Kim Martin
Defencemen:  Angela Ruggiero,  Carla MacLeod
Forwards:  Maria Rooth,  Hayley Wickenheiser,  Gillian Apps
Source: IIHF.com

References

External links
IIHF Official Site
Complete results

IIHF results index for 2006

 
Ice hockey at the 2006 Winter Olympics
2006
Olympics
Women's ice hockey competitions in Italy
Women's events at the 2006 Winter Olympics